Enhancer of polycomb homolog 1 is a protein that in humans is encoded by the EPC1 gene.

References

Further reading